The Vision and the Voice is the debut studio album by American rock band Kommunity FK, released in 1983 by Independent Project Records. It was later reissued in 1994 by Cleopatra Records and again in 2006 by Mobilization Records.

Reception 

Trouser Press called it "an excellent album, starting with its Boschian cover art depicting naked figures cavorting and fornicating around a giant red penis."

Track listing

References

External links 

 

1983 albums